Gilberto Reis Rocha (born 18 April 1986) is a Cape Verdean footballer who plays as a right-back for FC Echallens. He made five appearances for the Cape Verde national team in 2008.

Club career 
Reis moved to Switzerland at a young age. He played five games for Lausanne-Sport before the club faced bankruptcy. Reis stayed with club at 2. Liga interregional and back to Challenge League in three seasons.

International career
Reis received his first cap for Cape Verde national team at the friendly match against Luxembourg on 27 May 2008.

External links

football.ch

Living people
1986 births
Sportspeople from Coimbra
Cape Verdean emigrants to Switzerland
Cape Verdean footballers
Association football fullbacks
Cape Verde international footballers
Swiss Challenge League players
FC Lausanne-Sport players
Yverdon-Sport FC players
FC Le Mont players
FC Vevey United players
FC Echallens players
Cape Verdean expatriate footballers
Cape Verdean expatriate sportspeople in Switzerland
Expatriate footballers in Switzerland